White Oak Pond is a  water body in Grafton County in the Lakes Region of central New Hampshire, United States, in the town of Holderness. Water from White Oak Pond flows north to Squam Lake and is part of the Pemigewasset River watershed.

See also

List of lakes in New Hampshire

References

Lakes of Grafton County, New Hampshire